State assembly elections were held in Malaysia on 21 March 2004 in all states except Sarawak. The elections took place alongside general elections, and saw Barisan Nasional and its allies won majorities in all states except Kelantan where, despite earlier reports to the contrary, Pan-Malaysian Islamic Party (PAS) retained control with a narrow majority of 24 seats to BN's 21. The National Front regained control of the state of Terengganu, which it lost to the PAS in 1999.

Results

Perlis

Kedah

Kelantan

Terengganu

Penang

Perak

Pahang

Selangor

Negeri Sembilan

Malacca

Johor

Sabah

References

State elections in Malaysia
state